Prodyscherodes pauliani is a species of beetle in the family Carabidae, the only species in the genus Prodyscherodes.

References

Scaritinae